Trnje is a district of Zagreb, the capital of Croatia.

It may also refer to the following places:

Croatia
 Trnje, Zagreb County, a village near Velika Gorica, Croatia

Kosovo
 Trnje/Termje, a village in the municipality of Suva Reka/Suharekë, Kosovo

Slovenia
 Trnje, Črenšovci, a village in the Municipality of Črenšovci, northeastern Slovenia
 Trnje, Pivka, a village in the Municipality of Pivka, southwestern Slovenia
 Trnje, Škofja Loka, a village in the Municipality of Škofja Loka, northwestern Slovenia
 Trnje, Trebnje, a village in the Municipality of Trebnje, southeastern Slovenia